Thomas Bryan Strauthers (born April 6, 1961) is a former American football defensive lineman in the National Football League from 1983 through 1991. He played college football at Jackson State University.

Notes

1961 births
Living people
People from Wesson, Mississippi
American football defensive ends
Jackson State Tigers football players
Philadelphia Eagles players
Detroit Lions players
Minnesota Vikings players